Charles E. Sitton (born July 3, 1962) is an American retired basketball player. He played one season in the National Basketball Association (NBA) with the Dallas Mavericks, who selected him in the second round of the 1984 NBA draft. He went on to play in Europe.

Sitton played college basketball for the Oregon State Beavers. He was a three-time all-conference selection in the Pacific-10 (now known as the Pac-12) and was an All-American as a senior. He helped lead the Beavers to three NCAA tournament appearances.

Oregon State career
A 6' 8" forward, he played high school basketball at McMinnville High School and college basketball for Oregon State from 1981 to 1984. As a freshman, Sitton was a member of the last Oregon State team to achieve a number 1 ranking in 1981. He was a two-time All-American and three-time All-Pac-10 selection, and was chosen as Oregon State's MVP in 1983. In Sitton's four years at Oregon State, the Beavers were 93-25 and appeared in the NCAA tournament three times and the NIT once. Sitton scored 1,561 points in his college career, and shot at a .575 field goal percentage.

After college
Sitton was drafted by the Dallas Mavericks in the second round of the 1984 NBA draft and played one season for the Mavericks before continuing his career in Europe. He was named to both the Oregon Sports Hall of Fame and the OSU Athletic Hall of Fame in 1997.

References

External links

NBA statistics
Italian League statistics

1962 births
Living people
All-American college men's basketball players
American expatriate basketball people in Italy
American men's basketball players
Basket Brescia Leonessa players
Basketball players at the 1983 Pan American Games
Basketball players from Oregon
Dallas Mavericks draft picks
Dallas Mavericks players
McDonald's High School All-Americans
Medalists at the 1983 Pan American Games
Oregon State Beavers men's basketball players
Pan American Games gold medalists for the United States
Pan American Games medalists in basketball
Parade High School All-Americans (boys' basketball)
Reyer Venezia players
Small forwards
Sportspeople from McMinnville, Oregon